The Monterey Bay Aquarium Research Institute (MBARI) is a private, non-profit oceanographic research center in Moss Landing, California. MBARI was founded in 1987 by David Packard, and is primarily funded by the David and Lucile Packard Foundation. Christopher Scholin serves as the institute's president and chief executive officer, managing a work force of approximately 220 scientists, engineers, and operations and administrative staff.

At MBARI, scientists and engineers work together to develop new tools and methods for studying the ocean. Long-term funding from the David and Lucile Packard Foundation allows the institute to take on studies that traditional granting institutions may be reluctant to sponsor. Part of David Packard's charge for MBARI was to "Take risks. Ask big questions. Don't be afraid to make mistakes; if you don't make mistakes, you're not reaching far enough."

MBARI's campus in Moss Landing is located near the center of Monterey Bay, at the head of the Monterey Canyon. Monterey Bay is one of the most biologically diverse bodies of waters in the world, and the underlying submarine canyon is one of the deepest underwater canyons along the continental United States. With this 4,000-meter-deep submarine canyon only a few ship-hours from their base of operations, institute scientists enjoy an advantageous proximity to this natural, deep-sea "laboratory".

MBARI is not open to the general public, but it has an open house once a year. Although MBARI is a sister institution to the Monterey Bay Aquarium, the two organizations have entirely separate management and funding.

Research 
MBARI's scientists, engineers, and support staff collaborate on a wide range of cutting-edge marine research projects enabled by innovative technology. MBARI's current efforts span the interdisciplinary fields of ocean science, including marine biology, geology, chemistry, and biological oceanography. MBARI also develops new oceanographic research tools and techniques, as well as technology related to ocean observatories.

Much of MBARI's research focuses on the development and use of robotic vehicles and other automated methods for gathering information in the ocean. These tools provide a unique view of ocean life and physical phenomena.

Research vessels 

The Western Flyer has supported ROV dives along much of the west coast of North America, from the Gulf of California to Vancouver Island, as well as around the Hawaiian islands.

In December 2011, MBARI retired the  after 23 years of service. The Research Vessel Rachel Carson is able to launch both ROVs and AUVs, as well as conduct multi-day expeditions.

Underwater vehicles 
MBARI has been a pioneer in the development and scientific use of two types of underwater robots—remotely operated vehicles (ROVs) and autonomous underwater vehicles (AUVs). ROVs are robotic submersibles that are connected through a very long tether to a ship at the sea surface. They are controlled by pilots and researchers on board the surface ship. AUVs are robotic submersibles that are programmed at the sea surface and then released to collect data autonomously, with little or no human intervention.

MBARI's ROV Doc Ricketts is a four kilometer depth-rated vehicle, named after the pioneering marine ecologist Ed Ricketts. ROV Doc Ricketts has been deployed from the R/V Western Flyer since 2009, when it replaced ROV Tiburon, which had been deployed from the R/V Western Flyer since 1997. 

ROV Ventana is a 1.8 km depth-rated vehicle. It was built for the Monterey Bay Aquarium Research Institute by International Submarine Engineering according to specifications developed by David Packard and the original core group of scientists and engineers at MBARI. The vehicle was delivered in 1988 with a standard suite of instruments and cameras. Data collection sensors, a high definition camera, and animal collection devices have been added over the course of more than 3,600 dives.

In addition to ROVs, MBARI has also developed untethered undersea robots called autonomous underwater vehicles (AUVs). Dorado-class AUVs currently operational at MBARI include the upper-water-column AUV, the seafloor mapping AUV, and the imaging AUV. The core vehicle elements are deep-rated (the mapping AUV is 6,000 meters rated) and have been operated as long as 20 hours.

MBARI's Tethys AUV, also called the long-range AUV, is a new AUV designed to operate over longer ranges. Tethys provides capabilities falling between existing propeller driven AUVs, which typically have endurances on the order of a day, and buoyancy-driven vehicles (gliders) that can operate for many months. In October 2011, Tethys spent 24 days at sea traveling nearly 1,800 km.

Notable achievements 
Frequent forays with remotely operated vehicles to the deep Monterey Canyon have enabled MBARI researchers to discover new animal species on a regular basis, and to begin to understand their significance in the ecology of the deep sea.

Some of the more notable species first described by MBARI researchers include Stellamedusa ventana (bumpy jelly), Tiburonia granrojo (big red), Chaetopterus pugaporcinus (pigbutt worm), and the Osedax species of bone-eating worms. Bruce Robison was also the first to observe the transparent head of the barreleye fish Macropinna microstoma.

In 2008, MBARI deployed the Monterey Accelerated Research System (MARS)—the first deep-sea cabled observatory offshore of the continental United States. MARS enables researchers to hook up a variety of scientific instruments such as earthquake monitors and low-light video cameras and leave them on the deep seafloor for extended periods of time. Funded in 2002 by a grant from the National Science Foundation, the MARS Observatory was developed through a collaborative effort by MBARI, Woods Hole Oceanographic Institution, the University of Washington Applied Physics Laboratory, NASA's Jet Propulsion Laboratory, L-3 MariPro, and Alcatel-Lucent.

MBARI researchers have also made pioneering developments in the area of microbial oceanography. MBARI Postdoctoral Fellow Oded Beja and Scientist Edward DeLong were the first to discover a gene in several species of bacteria responsible for production of the protein rhodopsin, previously unheard of in the domain Bacteria. First developments in several areas of metagenomics have also been made at MBARI. DeLong was among the first to use metagenomics in the ocean and MBARI Scientist Alexandra Worden led the development of eukaryotic targeted metagenomics, which allows specific eukaryotic cells to be selected from natural samples and partial genomes from those uncultured cells then sequenced, assembled and analyzed.

In 2001, MBARI scientists and engineers detected the onset and development of a harmful algal bloom (HAB) using the Environmental Sample Processor (ESP)—an undersea, robotic DNA laboratory. Using the ESP, researchers are able to conduct molecular biological analyses remotely, in real-time, over a sustained period, and with interactive capability. The ESP provides in situ collection and analysis of water samples, such as the analysis of the genetic material of marine microorganisms in seawater.

References

External links 
 Monterey Bay Aquarium Research Institute

Oceanographic organizations
Research institutes in California
Monterey Bay
Monterey Bay Aquarium
Buildings and structures in Monterey County, California
1987 establishments in California
Research institutes established in 1987